Socialist Party of National Liberation - Provisional (in Catalan: Partit Socialista d'Alliberament Nacional - Provisional, PSAN-P. PSANp or PSAN (p)) was a pro-Catalan independence political party in the Catalan Countries. The PSAN-P was formed in 1974, as a split of the Socialist Party of National Liberation (PSAN). The main leaders of the party were  Carles Castellanos, Eva Serra i Puig and Agustí Alcoberro.

Ideology and tactics
This new party was more in favor of armed struggle then the PSAN, which forced a significant part of its direction into exile. The PSAN-P had a rupturist and national-popular character and supported direct confrontation with the state. The PSAN-P signed a treaty with ETA and the Unión do Pobo Galego (UPG) to work jointly with this national liberation movements and signed the Brest Charter.

The party was also in favour of a "sectorial front"-like organization. Due to this the PSAN-P created and union, the Col·lectius d'Obrers en Lluita, and helped two armed organizations; Arxiu (1978-1979), Exèrcit d'Alliberament Català and the Organització de la Lluita Armada (OLLA, 1974). In 1978 the PSAN-P and other organizations also created the Catalan Committee against the Spanish Constitution.

The PSAN-P joined Independentists of the Catalan Countries in March 1979, and disappeared shortly after.

References

 PSAN-p
Left-wing militant groups in Spain
Political parties in Catalonia
Political parties in Northern Catalonia
Political parties established in 1974
Political parties disestablished in 1979
Catalan independence movement
Anti-Francoism